Upbeat Records is an independent record label that releases the work of Cake.

History
Originally, Columbia Records requested that Cake release a greatest hits compilation, but the band promptly refused. During the legal fall-out, Cake formed its own record label and released B-Sides and Rarities.

References

External links
 Cake's Official Site

American independent record labels
Cake (band)